WVPP-LP was a Contemporary Christian and Religious radio station licensed to and serving Beckley, West Virginia. WVPP-LP was owned and operated by Calvary Assembly of God.

The station's license was cancelled by the Federal Communications Commission on March 5, 2021, due to WVPP-LP having been off the air since at least July 9, 2019.

References

External links
 97.9 FM The Wind Online
 

2005 establishments in West Virginia
Radio stations established in 2005
VPP-LP
VPP-LP
Radio stations disestablished in 2021
2021 disestablishments in West Virginia
Defunct radio stations in the United States
Defunct religious radio stations in the United States
VPP-LP